Mali national under-20 football team, represents Mali in association football at an under-20 age level and is controlled by Malian Football Federation, the governing body for football in Mali. The current coach is Mahamoutou Kane.

Their greatest achievement to date is finishing third in both the 1999 FIFA U-20 World Cup and in the 2015 FIFA U-20 World Cup, where they defeated Senegal 3-1 in the third-place match.

Players

Current squad
The following players were selected to take part in the 2019 FIFA U-20 World Cup.

Achievements
 Africa U-20 Cup of Nations
 Runners-up: 1989
 3rd Place: 2003
 Champions: 2019
 FIFA U-20 World Cup
 3rd Place: 1999
 3rd Place: 2015
 Did not qualify: 2017
 Quarter-finals: 2019

See also
 Mali national football team
 Mali national under-17 football team

References

External links
Mali U-20 profile - eurosport.fr

20
African national under-20 association football teams